Dominic Terry Reed (born 27 March 1990) is an English former cricketer.

Reed was born at Leicester and attended De Lisle College in nearby Loughborough. From there he went up to Cardiff University. While studying at Cardiff, Reed played for Cardiff MCCU in the season before the team gained first-class status. Alongside Cardiff MCCU teammate Tom Friend, Reed was called up to the Unicorns squad for the 2011 Clydesdale Bank 40, but did not feature in any of the Unicorns matches in the tournament. He played minor counties cricket for Cambridgeshire in 2012, making three appearances in the MCCA Knockout Trophy, before playing for Norfolk in the 2013 MCCA Knockout Trophy. He did feature for the Unicorns in the 2013 Yorkshire Bank 40, making his List A one-day debut during the tournament against Glamorgan at Southend-on-Sea. He took five wickets on debut when he took 5 for 31 from eight overs in Glamorgan's innings. He made five further List A appearances during the tournament. With his right-arm medium-fast bowling he took 7 wickets across his six List A matches, which came at an average of 28.85.

He is employed as the head of cricket at Kingston Grammar School. His brother, Michael, has played first-class cricket.

References

External links

1990 births
Living people
People from Leicester
Alumni of Cardiff University
English cricketers
Cambridgeshire cricketers
Norfolk cricketers
Unicorns cricketers
Schoolteachers from Leicestershire